Anthony Millan, known professionally as Tony Millan, is a British character actor and television comedy scriptwriter. Millan appeared in numerous roles, predominantly in sitcoms and drama series on British television throughout the 1980s and 1990s.

Early life
Millan was born in Edmonton, London, England in 1946. He was educated in London and trained there as an actor.

Career
Millan has had a career in British television spanning several decades.

Personal life
Millan married Marilyn J Honig in 1971 in London. The marriage produced three children.

Selected filmography
The Girls of Slender Means (3 episodes, 1975) as Ernest Claymore
Holding On (1977) as officer in trench
Citizen Smith (1977–1980) as Tucker
Mixed Blessings (1980) as Giovanni
Holding the Fort (1980) as Daniel
L for Lester (3 episodes, 1982) as Sid
Lame Ducks (series 1 and 2, 1984–1985) as Maurice
Roll Over Beethoven (1985) as waiter
The Lenny Henry Show (2 episodes, 1985)
Sweet Sixteen (2 episodes, 1986) as Tom Sherrin
Hot Metal (series 2, episode 3, 1988) as peasant
Alexei Sayle's Stuff (1988–1991) multiple roles
Close To Home (1990) as Mr Gill
May to December as Mr Kennedy (1990)
On The Up (1991) as Chalky Smith
The Brittas Empire (1991) as Ken Owen
One Foot in the Grave (1992) as Jack Aylesbury
As Time Goes By (1992) as gorillagram
If You See God, Tell Him (1993) as Leonard Ewbank
The Bill (1993) as Mr Linnell
Hale and Pace (TV series) (1993)
Casualty (series nine, 1994) as George a paramedic
Nelson's Column (series 1, episode 4, 1994) as theatre manager
Grange Hill (1 episode, 1995) as Mr Dennis
Jack and Jeremy's Real Lives (1996)
Last of the Summer Wine (1 episode, 1997) as Gunnie
Birds of a Feather (series 7, 1997) as the hotel manager
Goodnight Sweetheart (series 6, 1999) as Kenneth
High Hopes (2 episodes, 2006) as Renfield

Writing credits
ChuckleVision (series 1 and series 16)
A Prince Among Men (series 1)
Birds of a Feather (3 episodes)
Not with a Bang (entire series)
The Brittas Empire (5 episodes)

Voice acting credits
Big Finish, Dr Who series audio books (several roles)

References

External links

Tony Millan(Aveleyman)

1946 births
Male actors from London
People from Edmonton, London
Writers from London
Living people
English male television actors
English television writers
20th-century English male actors